Sellrain is a municipality in the district of Innsbruck-Land in the Austrian state of Tyrol located 14.40 km southwest of Innsbruck in the Sellrain Valley. The Melach River and its tributary the Fotscherbach flow through it. Most people in the village are farmers and also have another job in the neighboring Innsbruck. There are two Catholic churches in the village St. Quirin and St. Anna. They are both over 300 years old.

Population

History 
The first settlement developed around the ferruginous healing spring Rothenbrunn, which was used by Innsbruck nobles and citizens since the Middle Ages. The place name is first mentioned in a document in 1271 as Selrain. The origin of the name is disputed. It may be based on the ancient field name *selia ('Sennhütte'). In any case, the name is pre-Roman.

References

External links

Cities and towns in Innsbruck-Land District